Amy Beth Hayes (born 8 October 1982) is a British actress. She is best known for her roles as Kitty in Mr Selfridge; Lucy in "The Entire History of You", an episode of Black Mirror; Ruth in Misfits; Clementine in Shameless; Amy in The Syndicate; and Maxine Fox in Sirens. She has also appeared in Doctor Who and Secret Diary of a Call Girl.

Career

Hayes was born in Abergavenny, Wales, but grew up in Darlington, northeast England. She made her screen debut in the 2008 Doctor Who episode "The Stolen Earth" and the same year she was cast in a lead role in the ITV drama Whatever It Takes.

Hayes appeared in the 2009 Romanian film Eva, and in Micro Men, a BBC-made film charting the rise and fall of the home computer industry in the United Kingdom in the early 1980s, where she played Cynthia alongside Martin Freeman. In 2009, she played Ruth, an old woman restored temporarily to her younger self by a peculiar thunder storm, in E4's superhero comedy-drama Misfits as well as Daisy in Whatever It Takes, written by Paula Milne.

In 2011 she played Lucy in "The Entire History of You", an episode of the anthology series Black Mirror created by Charlie Brooker. In 2012, she starred in BBC drama The Syndicate, playing the girlfriend of one of the lottery winners. From 2012 to 2016 she appeared in the ITV drama Mr Selfridge (2013) as Kitty Hawkins Edwards.

Her stage work includes Jerusalem with Mark Rylance, Linda for The Royal Court and On the Waterfront directed by Stephen Berkoff.

Filmography

Television

Film

References

External links

British television actresses
British film actresses
Living people
21st-century British actresses
People from Abergavenny
1982 births